Alcázar del Rey is a municipality in the province of Cuenca, Castile-La Mancha, Spain. It had a population of 142 as of 2020.

References 

Municipalities in the Province of Cuenca